Micronix is a genus of moths of the family Crambidae. It contains only one species, Micronix nivalis, which is found in Venezuela.

References

Crambinae
Taxa named by Hans Georg Amsel
Crambidae genera